Seven Mile may refer to:

Places
 Seven Mile, Arizona, USA
 Seven Mile, Ohio, USA
 Seven Mile Beach (disambiguation)
 Seven Mile Bridge, Florida, USA
 Seven Mile Creek (disambiguation)
 Seven Mile Dam, British Columbia, Canada
 Seven Mile Ford, Virginia, USA
 Seven Mile Island (disambiguation)
 Seven Mile River (disambiguation)

Other
 The Seven Mile Journey, Danish post-rock band
 7 Mile (band), American R&B group
 7 Mile (album), the group's eponymous album